The Commodity Futures Trading Commission (CFTC) is an independent agency of the US government created in 1974 that regulates the U.S. derivatives markets, which includes futures, swaps, and certain kinds of options.

The Commodity Exchange Act (CEA),  et seq., prohibits fraudulent conduct in the trading of futures, swaps, and other derivatives.  The stated mission of the CFTC is to promote the integrity, resilience, and vibrancy of the U.S. derivatives markets through sound regulation. After the financial crisis of 2007–08 and since 2010 with the Dodd–Frank Wall Street Reform and Consumer Protection Act, the CFTC has been transitioning to bring more transparency and sound regulation to the multitrillion dollar swaps market.

History

Futures contracts for agricultural commodities have been traded in the U.S. for more than 150 years and have been under federal regulation since the 1920s. The Grain Futures Act of 1922 set the basic authority and was changed by the Commodity Exchange Act of 1936 (7 U.S.C. 1 et seq.).

Since the 1970s, trading in futures contracts has rapidly expanded beyond traditional physical and agricultural commodities into a vast array of financial instruments, including foreign currencies, U.S. and foreign government securities, and U.S. and foreign stock indices.

Congress created the CFTC in 1974 as an independent federal regulatory agency. The Commodity Futures Trading Commission Act of 1974 (P.L. 93-463) created the CFTC to replace the U.S. Department of Agriculture's Commodity Exchange Authority. The Act made extensive changes to the Commodity Exchange Act (CEA) of 1936, which itself amended the original Grain Futures Act of 1922.  (7 U.S.C. 1 et seq.). In 1975, the first members were selected, and also its first chairman.

The CFTC's mandate was renewed and expanded in December 2000 when Congress passed the Commodity Futures Modernization Act of 2000, which instructed the Securities and Exchange Commission (SEC) and the CFTC to develop a joint regulatory regime for single-stock futures, the products of which began trading in November 2002.

In 2010, the Dodd–Frank Wall Street Reform and Consumer Protection Act expanded the CFTC's regulatory authority into the swaps markets. The swaps markets currently have a notional value of more than $400 trillion.

Regulated markets
The CFTC oversees the derivatives markets by encouraging their competitiveness and efficiency, ensuring their integrity, protecting market participants against manipulation, abusive trading practices, fraud, and ensuring the financial integrity of the clearing process. The CFTC generally does not directly regulate the safety and soundness of individual firms, with the exception of newly regulated swap dealers and major swap participants, for whom it sets capital standards pursuant to Dodd–Frank. Through oversight, the CFTC enables the derivatives markets to serve the function of price discovery and offsetting price risk.

As of 2014 the CFTC oversees 'designated contract markets' (DCMs) or exchanges, swap execution facilities (SEFs), derivatives clearing organizations, swap data repositories (SDRs), swap dealers, futures commission merchants, commodity pool operators and other intermediaries. The CFTC coordinates its work with foreign regulators, such as its UK counterpart, the Financial Conduct Authority, which supervises the London Metal Exchange.

Over-the-counter derivatives

In 1998 CFTC chairperson Brooksley E. Born lobbied Congress and the President to give the CFTC oversight of 'off-exchange markets' for over-the-counter (OTC) derivatives in addition to its existing oversight of exchange-traded derivatives, but her warnings were opposed by other regulators.<ref name="nytimes">Goodman, Peter S. The Reckoning – Taking Hard New Look at a Greenspan Legacy, The New York Times, October 9, 2008.</ref>

Two actions by the CFTC in 1998 led some market participants to express concerns that the CFTC might modify the "Swap Exemption" and attempt to impose new regulations on the swaps market. First, in a February 1998 comment letter addressing the SEC's "broker-dealer lite" proposal, the CFTC stated that the SEC's proposal would create the potential for conflict with the Commodity Exchange Act (CEA) to the extent that certain OTC derivative instruments fall within the ambit of the CEA and are subject to the exclusive statutory authority of the CFTC.

In May 1998 the CFTC issued a 'concept release' requesting comment on whether regulation of OTC derivatives markets was appropriate and, if so, what form such regulation should take. Legislation enacted in 1999 at the request of the US Treasury, the Federal Reserve Board, and the SEC limited the CFTC's rulemaking authority with respect to swaps and hybrid instruments until March 30, 1999, and froze the pre-existing legal status of swap agreements and hybrid instruments entered into in reliance on the 'Swap Exemption', the 'Hybrid Instrument Rule', the 'Swap Policy Statement, or the 'Hybrid Interpretation'. The text of that act read: "...the Commission may not propose or issue any rule or regulation, or issue any interpretation or policy statement, that restricts or regulates activity in a qualifying hybrid instrument or swap agreement".  Shortly after Congress had passed this legislation prohibiting CFTC from regulating derivatives, Born resigned. She later commented the failure of Long-Term Capital Management and the subsequent bailout as being indicative what she had been trying to prevent.Born was the focus of an October 2009 Frontline documentary titled "The Warning" and was also chronicled in the documentary Inside Job. The two films recount her attempts to investigate and regulate the OTC derivatives market (PBS Frontline The Warning)

Regulating digital currencies
In March 2014 the CFTC acknowledged it was considering the regulation of Bitcoin. The CFTC has since taken the position that Bitcoin is a commodity under the CEA. In October 2019, former CFTC Chairman Heath Tarbert, now Chief Legal Officer of Citadel Securities, declared that ether was also a commodity under the CEA.

In 2015, the CFTC ruled that for purposes of trading, cryptocurrencies were legally classified as commodities. However, in view of market volatility and other factors, the CFTC noted several risks associated with trading virtual currencies. In 2017, the CFTC cited the US SEC's warning against digital token sales and initial coin offerings (ICOs) that can "improperly entice investors with promises of high returns". In recent years, the CFTC has expanded its efforts to civilly prosecute fraud and misappropriation in the digital asset markets.

Organization
Based in Washington, D.C., the CFTC maintains regional offices in Chicago, New York and Kansas City, Missouri. The Commission consists of five Commissioners appointed by the President of the United States to serve staggered five-year terms. The President, with the consent of the United States Senate, designates one of the commissioners to serve as chairman. No more than three commissioners at any one time may be from the same political party.

Current commissioners

Major operating units

Division of Enforcement
The Division of Enforcement (DOE) investigates and prosecutes alleged violations of the Commodity Exchange Act and CFTC regulations. Violations may involve commodity futures or option trading on domestic commodity exchanges, or the improper marketing of commodity investments. The Division may, at the direction of the Commission, file complaints before the agency's administrative law judges or in the U.S. District Courts. Alleged criminal violations of the Commodity Exchange Act or violations of other Federal laws which involve commodity futures trading may be referred to the Justice Department for prosecution. The Division also provides expert help and technical assistance with case development and trials to U.S. Attorneys' Offices, other Federal and state regulators, and international authorities.

 Division of Market Oversight 
The Division of Market Oversight (DMO) has regulatory responsibility for initial recognition and continuing oversight of trade execution facilities, including new registered futures exchanges, swap execution facilities, and swap data repositories. The regulatory functions of the Division include, among other things, rule enforcement reviews, reviews of new products and product- and market-related rule amendments, and associated product and market-related studies. The Division was previously responsible for market and trade practice surveillance.

Market Participants Division
Formerly known as the Division of Swap Dealer and Intermediary Oversight, the Market Participants Division (MPD) primarily oversees derivatives market intermediaries, including commodity pool operators, commodity trading advisors, futures commission merchants, introducing brokers, major swap participants, retail foreign exchange dealers, and swap dealers, as well as designated self-regulatory organizations. MPD conducts the registration, compliance, and business conduct standards of intermediaries, swap dealers and major swap participants. The division also oversees the agency's customer education initiatives.

Division of Clearing and Risk
The Division of Clearing and Risk (DCR) oversees derivatives clearing organizations (DCOs) and other market participants in the clearing process. These include futures commission merchants, swap dealers, major swap participants, and large traders. DCR monitors the clearing of futures, options on futures, and swaps by DCOs, assesses DCO compliance with Commission regulations, and conducts risk assessment and surveillance. DCR also makes recommendations on DCO applications and eligibility, rule submissions, and which types of swaps should be cleared. As of 2019, Clark Hutchison serves as Director of the Division of Clearing and Risk.

List of past commissioners

 Dan M. Berkovitz (term of service 09/07/18 – 10/15/21)
Brian D. Quintenz (term of service 08/15/17 – 08/31/21)
Heath Tarbert (Chairman 07/15/2019 – 01/21/2021) (term of Service 07/15/2019 – 03/05/2021)
 J. Christopher Giancarlo (Acting Chairman 01/20/17 – 08/03/17) (Chairman 08/03/17 – 04/13/19) (term of Service 06/06/14 – 06/05/19)
 Sharon Y. Bowen (term of Service 06/09/14 – 09/29/17)
 Timothy Massad (term of Service 6/5/14 – 02/17/17)
 Mark P. Wetjen (term of Service 10/25/11 – 08/28/15)
 Scott D. O'Malia (term of Service 10/19/09 – 08/08/14)
 Bart Chilton (term of Service 08/08/07 – 03/21/14)
 Gary Gensler (Chairman 05/26/09 – 01/3/14) (term of Service 05/26/09 – 01/3/14)
 Jill E. Sommers (term of Service 08/08/07 – 07/08/13)
 Michael V. Dunn (Acting Chairman 1/20/09 – 5/25/09)  (term of Service 11/21/04 – 10/24/11)
 Walter L. Lukken (Acting Chairman 6/27/07- 01/20/09) (term of Service 08/07/02 – 07/10/09)
 Reuben Jeffery, III (chairman 07/11/05 – 6/27/07) (term of Service 07/11/05 – 06/27/07)
 Frederick W. Hatfield (term of Service 12/06/04 – 12/31/06)
 Sharon Brown-Hruska (Acting Chairman 08/24/04 – 07/10/05) (term of Service 08/07/02 – 07/28/06)
 James E. Newsome (Acting Chairman 01/20/01 – 12/27/01) (chairman 12/27/01 – 07/23/04) (term of Service 08/10/98 – 07/23/04)
 Thomas J. Erickson (term of Service 06/21/99 – 12/01/02)
 Barbara P. Holum (Acting Chairwoman 12/22/93 – 10/07/94)  (term of Service 11/28/93 – 12/09/03)
 David D. Spears (Acting Chairman 06/02/99 – 08/10/99) (term of Service 09/03/96 – 12/20/01)
 Brooksley E. Born (Chairwoman 08/26/96 – 06/01/99)
 John E. Tull, Jr. (Acting Chairman 01/27/96 – 08/25/96)  (term of Service 11/24/93 – 02/27/99)
 Joseph B. Dial (term of Service 06/20/91 – 11/13/97)
 Mary L. Schapiro (Chairwoman 10/13/94 – 01/26/96)  (term of Service 10/13/94 – 01/26/96)
 Sheila C. Bair (Acting Chairwoman 08/22/93 – 12/21/93)  (term of Service 05/02/91 – 06/16/95)
 William P. Albrecht (Acting Chairman 01/22/93 – 08/20/93)  (term of Service 11/22/88 – 08/20/93)
 Wendy L. Gramm (term of Service 02/22/88 – 01/22/93)
 Fowler C. West (term of Service 10/06/82 – 01/20/93)
 Kalo A. Hineman (Acting Chairman 07/27/87 – 02/22/83)  (term of Service 01/12/82 – 06/19/91)
 Robert R. Davis (terms of Service 10/03/84 – 04/30/90)
 William Rainer (term of Service 08/11/99 – 01/19/01)
 William E. Seale (term of Service 11/16/83 – 09/01/88)
 Susan M. Philips (Chairwoman 11/17/83 – 07/24/87) (Acting Chairwoman 05/28/83 – 11/16/83)  (term of Service 11/16/81 – 07/24/87)
 Philip McBride Johnson (Chairman 6/8/81 – 5/01/83) (term of Service 06/06/81 – 05/01/83)
 James M. Stone (Chairman 05/04/79 – 06/08/81)  (term of Service 05/04/79 – 01/31/83)
 Reed P. Dunn (term of Service 04/15/75 – 11/13/81)
 David G. Gartner (term of Service 05/19/78 – 10/05/82)
 Robert L. Martin (term of Service 06/20/75 – 08/31/81)
 Gary L. Seevers (Acting Chairman 12/06/78 – 05/03/79)  (term of Service 04/15/75 – 06/01/79)
 Bill Bagley (term of Service 04/15/75 – 11/15/78)
 John V. Rainbolt (term of Service 04/15/75 – 05/18/78)

Funding/budget
Unlike the other four main financial regulators, the CFTC does not have self-funding. A transaction fee has been "requested" for several years but Congress has not taken any legislative action. During the government shut down in October 2013, SEC and Federal Reserve stayed open, but "futures and most swaps markets were left with essentially no cop on the beat".

In 2013 CFTC's performance was severely affected by limited resources and had to delay cases. The current, FY 2014 funding of  did not keep up with CFTC's increasing swaps market oversight and regulation, equivalent to tens of trillions of dollars in formerly dark market trading, according to outgoing Commissioner Bart Chilton in his last speech. The Obama administration's latest budget proposal for FY 2015 requested , which is  less than the request for the previous year, and would fund "100 less employees than we need" per Chilton, who called the budget "woefully insufficient" for CFTC's more than 40-fold increased purview.
In February 2014, Commissioner Scott D. O'Malia dissented from the FY 2014 spending plan saying that it did not allocate enough funding to new technology investments, but allocated too much to swap dealer oversight, duplicating the work of the self-regulatory National Futures Association. In March he dissented from the FY 2015 budget request stating CFTC "makes an unrealistic request for new staff and funding in this budget request without a firm understanding of its mission priorities, specific goals, and corresponding personnel and technology needs."

Chairman Tarbert commented that this "fully matched" the CFTC's request, the first time that had happened in "nearly a decade."

 Primary exchanges monitored 
 Chicago Board Options Exchange
 Chicago Board of Trade
 Chicago Mercantile Exchange
 COMEX
 Kansas City Board of Trade
 Minneapolis Grain Exchange
 North American Derivatives Exchange
 New York Mercantile Exchange
 New York Board of Trade
 OneChicago

See also

 Commodity
 CFTC report
 Federal Trade Commission
 Forex scam
 Hunter Wise Commodities
 Managed futures account
 Futures Industry Association, trade organization
 Securities market participants (United States)
 Title 17 of the Code of Federal Regulations
 CFTC Whistleblower Program
 2000s commodities boom
 2020s commodities boom
 Digital Commodities Consumer Protection Act

Notes

References

Further reading
 "The Warning", PBS(WGBH) Frontline October 20, 2009. Documentary about 2008 financial collapse with Brooksley Born speaking about her failed campaign to regulate the derivatives market. https://randosity.wordpress.com/2010/11/26/film-review-the-warning-pbs-frontline-documentary/ See also: Background material
 The Commodity Futures Trading Commission: Background and Current Issues published by the Congressional Research Service June 24, 2013, 379 KB, 23pp
 CFTC Official Tied to Wall Street Profits From Merger Fight (January 2015), Bloomberg Businessweek''

External links
 
 Commodity Futures Trading Commission in the Federal Register
 Commodity Futures Trading Commission on USAspending.gov

 
Financial services companies established in 1975
Financial regulatory authorities of the United States
Government agencies established in 1975